Rick Adams may refer to:

Rick Adams (baseball) (1878–1955), American baseball player
Rick Adams (Internet pioneer), American founder of UUNET
Rick Adams (television presenter) (born 1972), English television presenter and online radio DJ

See also
Ricky Adams (1959–2011), Major League Baseball player
Ricky G. Adams, American police officer and soldier
Richard Adams (disambiguation)
Dick Adams (disambiguation)
Adams (surname)